The Church of Notre-Dame-de-Bonsecours is a historic church located in Nancy, France. 

It used to be the resting place of the Polish king Stanisław Leszczyński, who was the last duke of Lorraine. A large stone relief of the coat of arms of the Polish–Lithuanian Commonwealth is located on the clock tower on the main front.

Images

References

External links 

Baroque buildings in France
Roman Catholic churches in Nancy, France